Jayde Taylor (born 3 April 1985) is an Australian female field hockey player.

References

External links
 

1985 births
Living people
Australian female field hockey players
Field hockey players at the 2012 Summer Olympics
Olympic field hockey players of Australia
Field hockey players at the 2014 Commonwealth Games
Commonwealth Games medallists in field hockey
Commonwealth Games gold medallists for Australia
Medallists at the 2014 Commonwealth Games